The Mississippi County Courthouse for the Chickasawba District is located at 200 West Walnut Street in Blytheville, Arkansas, one of Mississippi County's two seats (the other is Osceola).  It is a -story brick-and-cut-sandstone structure, designed by the Pine Bluff firm of Selligman and Ellesvard, and built in 1919.  It is a fine local example of Colonial Revival styling, with a recessed center entrance and a projecting modillioned cornice.  The interior has had few alterations since its construction.

The building was listed on the National Register of Historic Places in 1996.

See also
Mississippi County Courthouse (Osceola, Arkansas), the county's other courthouse
National Register of Historic Places listings in Mississippi County, Arkansas

References

Colonial Revival architecture in Arkansas
Government buildings completed in 1919
Courthouses on the National Register of Historic Places in Arkansas
County courthouses in Arkansas
National Register of Historic Places in Mississippi County, Arkansas
Blytheville, Arkansas
1919 establishments in Arkansas